Mahlon Dickerson Eyre (April 13, 1821 – August 28, 1882) was an American neoclassical sculptor who worked in Italy.

Born in Philadelphia, Pennsylvania, the son of a successful merchant, he attended Princeton University. He traveled in Europe, and settled in Florence, Italy, where he met his wife Isabella. He exhibited 14 works at the 1876 Centennial Exposition in Philadelphia. One of these was a marble statuette of Hercules and Antaeus, a copy after Stefano Maderno's c. 1622-25 original.

His best-known work is a twice-lifesize marble statue of George Washington (ca. 1876), depicted standing at the prow of a boat while crossing the Delaware River. This was bought for Trenton, New Jersey in 1889, installed in Cadwalader Park in 1892, and moved to Montgomery Plaza in 1976.

Eyre is buried in Bagni di Lucca, Tuscany, Italy. He was an uncle of the architect Wilson Eyre.

References

1821 births
1882 deaths
Artists from Philadelphia
19th-century American sculptors
19th-century American male artists
American male sculptors
Pennsylvania Academy of the Fine Arts alumni
American expatriates in Italy
Relocated buildings and structures in New Jersey
Sculptors from Pennsylvania